Roberto Ubaldini (1581 – 22 April 1635) was a bishop and cardinal of the Catholic Church.

Biography
He was born in Florence. He was appointed Bishop of Montepulciano in 1607, and ordained to that post on 3 Feb 1608 by Jacques Davy du Perron, Archbishop of Sens, with Henri de Gondi, Bishop of Paris, and Jean de Bonsi, Bishop of Béziers, serving as co-consecrators. He was elevated to the status of cardinal in 1615, and made Prefect of the Sacred Congregation of the Council in 1621. He resigned from that position in 1623, shortly after resigning his position as bishop.

He served as nunzio in France, and served as secretary to Pope Paul V. He maintained a friendship with poets Marini and Bracciolini.

Episcopal succession
While bishop, he was the principal consecrator of:

References

1581 births
1635 deaths
17th-century Italian cardinals
Clergy from Florence
Members of the Sacred Congregation of the Council
Apostolic Nuncios to France
17th-century Italian Roman Catholic bishops
Bishops appointed by Pope Paul V